The discography of Italian dance music composer Robert Miles comprises five studio albums, four compilation albums, two extended plays, and thirteen singles.

Albums

Studio albums

Compilation albums

Extended plays

Singles

References

Electronic music discographies